The Judo Competition at the 1994 Asian Games was contested in sixteen weight classes, eight each for men and women. This competition was held from October 12 to October 15, 1994.

Medalists

Men

Women

Medal table

References 

 New Straits Times, October 12–16, 1994
 Results

External links
 
 Olympic Council of Asia

 
1994 Asian Games events
1994
Asian Games
Asian Games 1994